Banksia laevigata, commonly known as the tennis ball banksia, is a species of shrub that is endemic to Western Australia. It has serrated, broadly linear to narrow wedge-shaped leaves, yellow or yellowish green flowers, depending on subspecies, and linear to elliptic follicles with a slightly wrinkled surface.

Description
Both surface of young leaves are hairy but become glabrous with age. Each head contains up to 100 follicles surrounded by the remains of the flowers.

Taxonomy and naming
Banksia laevigata was first formally described in 1856 by Carl Meissner in de Candolle's Prodromus Systematis Naturalis Regni Vegetabilis from specimens collected by James Drummond in the Swan River Colony. The specific epithet (laevigata) is a Latin word meaning "smooth and polished".

In 1891, Otto Kuntze, in his Revisio Generum Plantarum, rejected the generic name Banksia L.f., on the grounds that the name Banksia had previously been published in 1776 as Banksia J.R.Forst & G.Forst, referring to the genus now known as Pimelea. Kuntze proposed Sirmuellera as an alternative, referring to this species as Sirmuellera laevigata. This application of the principle of priority was largely ignored by Kuntze's contemporaries, and Banksia L.f. was formally conserved and Sirmuellera rejected in 1940.

In 1965, Alex George described two subspecies in The Western Australian Naturalist and the names are accepted by the Australian Plant Census:
 Banksia laevigata subsp. fuscolutea that bright yellow perianth with rusty hairs;
 Banksia laevigata subsp. laevigata that has a creamy grey perianth with grey hairs.

Distribution and habitat
Subspecies fuscolutea is more widespread than the autonym and grows in shrubland between Lake Barker, Hyden and Mount Day near Norseman. Subspecies laevigata is found in the Ravensthorpe Range and along the Fitzgerald River where it grows in woodland and shrubland.

Conservation status
Subspecies fuscolutea is classified as "not threatened" by the Western Australian Government Department of Parks and Wildlife, but subsp. laevigata is classified as "Priority Four" is classified as "Priority Four" by the Government of Western Australia Department of Parks and Wildlife, meaning that is rare or near threatened.

Use in horticulture
Seeds do not require any treatment, and take 39 to 92 days to germinate.

References

laevigata
Eudicots of Western Australia
Plants described in 1856
Taxa named by Carl Meissner